Sudhakar Kulkarni (16 June 1937 – 30 May 2011) was an Indian cricket umpire. He stood in one Test match, India vs. Sri Lanka, in 1990 and five ODI games between 1986 and 1988.

See also
 List of Test cricket umpires
 List of One Day International cricket umpires

References

1937 births
2011 deaths
Place of birth missing
Indian Test cricket umpires
Indian One Day International cricket umpires